The 2020 season was Sabah's fifth competitive season in the highest tier of Malaysian football since the foundation of Malaysia Super League in 2004. It is also the 1st season for Sabah to play in Malaysia Super League after winning the 2019 Malaysia Premier League which got promoted. Along with the Malaysia Super League, the club participated in the Malaysia FA Cup and the Malaysia Cup.

Players

Competitions

Overview

Malaysia Super League

Table

Results summary

Results by matchday

Fixtures and Results

Malaysia FA Cup

Fixture

Statistics

Squad Statistics

|-
!colspan="14"|Goalkeepers

|-
!colspan="14"|Defenders

|-
!colspan="14"|Midfielders

|-
!colspan="14"|Forwards

‡ Player left the club mid-season

Clean sheets

References

2020
Sabah